Brian McClenahan (born June 12, 1982) is a former American rugby union player. McClenahan played both prop and hooker. He represented the USA Eagle XV side in the prop position. His debut for his country was in June 2009 against Wales. He was selected to tour with the USA Eagles squad for the Autumn 2010 tour of Europe. McClenahan played his club rugby for Olympic Club.

References

External links
 Player Profile eaglesxv.com
 Player Profile USA Rugby

1982 births
Living people
American rugby union players
United States international rugby union players
Rugby union hookers
Rugby union props